Lalla A. Essaydi (born 1956) is a Moroccan photographer known for her staged photographs of Arab women in contemporary art. She currently works in Boston, Massachusetts, and Morocco. Her current residence is in New York.

Early life and education
Essaydi was born in Marrakesh, Morocco in 1956. She left to attend high school in Paris at 16. She married after returning to Morocco and moved to Saudi Arabia where she had two children and divorced. Essaydi returned to Paris in the early 1990s to attend the École nationale supérieure des Beaux-Arts. She moved to Boston in 1996 and earned her BFA from Tufts University in 1999 and her MFA in painting and photography from the School of the Museum of Fine Arts in 2003.

Work
Influenced by her experiences growing up in Morocco and Saudi Arabia, Essaydi explores the ways that gender and power are inscribed on Muslim women's bodies and the spaces they inhabit. She has stated that her work is autobiographical and that she was inspired by the differences she perceived in women's lives in the United States versus in Morocco, in terms of freedom and identity. She explores a wide range of perspectives, including issues of diaspora, identity, and expected location through her studio practice in Boston. The inspiration for many of her works came from her childhood, in the physical space where she, as a young woman, was sent when she disobeyed. She stepped outside the permissible behavioral space, as defined by Moroccan culture. Essaydi said her works will become haunted by spaces she inhabited as a child.

Several pieces of her work (including Converging Territories) combine henna, which is traditionally used to decorate the hands and feet of brides, with Arabic calligraphy, a predominantly male practice. While she uses henna to apply calligraphy to her female subjects' bodies, the words are indecipherable in an attempt to question authority and meaning.

The women depicted in her exhibition of photographs, Les Femmes du Maroc, are represented as decorative and confined by the art of henna. Essaydi thus poses her subjects in a way that exemplifies society's views of women as primarily destined for mere beauty. Henna, however, is extremely symbolic, especially to Moroccan women. It is an association with familial celebrations of a young girl reaching puberty and transitioning into a mature woman. The use of henna in her work creates a silent atmosphere of the women "speaking" to each other through a quality of femininity. It is predominantly a painting process where women who are discouraged to work outside the home find a profitable work in applying a tattoo-like material. Beyond creating powerful pieces revolving around the art of henna, Essaydi includes interpretations of traditional Moroccan elements, including draped folds of cloths adorning women's bodies, mosaic, tiles, and Islamic architecture.

Exhibitions
Her work has been exhibited at the National Museum of African Art. In 2015, the San Diego Museum of Art mounted the exhibition, Lalla Essaydi: Photographs.

Collections
Her work is represented in a number of collections, including the Art Institute of Chicago; the Museum Fünf Kontinente Munich/ Germany; the San Diego Museum of Art; the Cornell Fine Arts Museum, Winter Park, Florida; the Fries Museum in Leeuwarden, The Netherlands; the Museum of Fine Arts, Boston; and the Williams College Museum of Art in Williamstown, Massachusetts.

Awards
She was named as #18 in Charchub's "Top 20 Contemporary Middle Eastern Artists in 2012-2014".

In 2012 she received a Medal Award from the School of the Museum of Fine Arts, Boston.

References

External links 

1956 births
Living people
École des Beaux-Arts alumni
Moroccan photographers
Moroccan women photographers
School of the Museum of Fine Arts at Tufts alumni
Tufts University alumni
21st-century photographers
21st-century Moroccan artists
Moroccan women artists
People from Marrakesh